The Children's Palace (in ) is a public facility in China where children engage in extra-curricular activities.

History and activity
The Pioneer movement and Pioneers Palace of the Soviet Union which began in 1930 spread to other Socialist countries, such as the People's Republic of China, where they are called Children's Palaces.

At a Children's Palace, the Chinese youth engage in extra-curricular activities, such as learning music, foreign languages, and computing skills, and doing sports.  In larger cities, each district has set up its own Children's Palace, while there is also a City Children's Palace whose larger auditorium and planetarium are shared by the children of all the City's Districts.

References

External links
 Guangzhou City Children's Palace (in Chinese)

Pioneer movement
Communist Youth League of China